Emanuel Gifford (died c 1633) was an English politician who sat in the House of Commons twice between 1621 and 1626.

Gifford was the son of Anthony Gifford, of Milton Damerell, Devon. He was possibly at Peterhouse, Cambridge in 1599 or 1600. He was awarded MA at Cambridge University and was incorporated at Oxford University on 30 August 1605. In 1621, he was elected Member of Parliament for Rye. He was elected MP for Bury St Edmunds in 1626.

Gifford probably died in 1633 as his will was proved in December of that year.

References

Year of birth missing
1633 deaths
Year of death uncertain
People from Rye, East Sussex
Alumni of Peterhouse, Cambridge
English MPs 1621–1622
English MPs 1626